Stan Stokes is an American painter known for his aviation art. His work hangs in three presidential libraries. Since the mid-1980s NASA has commissioned Stokes to paint 15 works ranging from the Space Shuttles to the SR-71 Blackbird. Stokes has also painted numerous works for Burt Rutan.

Stokes's works hang in the Air Force art collection, the United States Air Force Academy, The Pentagon, the San Diego Air & Space Museum, the Palm Springs Air Museum, the National Museum of Naval Aviation, and the Smithsonian's National Air and Space Museum.

His work encompasses portraits, landscapes, aviation and space, ships, cars. Stokes's art has been published in numerous books and periodicals. Stokes is continually working on a collection of paintings honoring the Tuskegee Airmen and other aviators of color. This collection now exceeds 85 original oil paintings.

Early Years & Education 
A third generation native Southern Californian, Stan grew up being surrounded by aviation of all kinds. His local airport was Brackett Field in La Verne where he would eventually earn his pilot's license. A little further away was the beginnings of what is now Planes of Fame Air Museum at Chino, CA. Stan remembers that “you could literally head out from our home in any direction and find a great airport.”

Starting his first week of college, Stan was given a set of acrylic paints in an introductory art class. Within a few days, he began developing a strong interest in painting at would quickly develop into a passion. In the next couple of years, painting became the driving force in Stan's life. But, he quickly realized that, to make a career of it, art needed to be treated as a business. Otherwise, the budding artist will eventually be forced to get a real job!

For the next several years, Stan's life was spent traveling across the Western United States doing “street shows." These were art shows in malls, parks, sidewalks and everywhere artists were allowed to show their works. One of the first mysteries that needed to be solved was the question of what people would buy that Stan also like to paint. For a while, the answer seemed to be landscapes. These were landscapes of a close in, rather intimate nature. With these paintings, Stan started to be noticed in the art world and he was able to get into a few good galleries, leaving the “street shows” behind. This enabled him to have a study income and a brighter future as a full-time artist.

Aviation into Art 
Stan hadn't left his passion for airplanes behind. During this time, Stan somehow managed to purchase an airplane, a 7KCAB Citabria. He still doesn't know how he managed to do this, but he did. With this airplane, he learned to fly aerobatics and how to manage a “tail dragger” type of airplane. Being half in the art world and half in the aviation world, Stan started to realize that there were quite a few people out there that liked aviation related art. In 1977, the two passions came together and he entered the aviation art world.

By 1980, Stan was now full time creating paintings for a growing list of clients. The following year, he was introduced to General Jimmy Doolittle. The two agreed to have Stan do a painting of the Doolittle Raiders B-25s taking off from the USS Hornet, ultimately heading for Tokyo. Part of their agreement was to have Stan produce a limited edition print of the painting and General Doolittle would sign the prints. All of this was done and General Doolittle gave all of his royalties from the project to the Boys and Girls Club.

This was followed by Stan's limited edition prints co-signed by Chuck Yeager, Pappy Boyington, The Flying Tigers (AVG) and many more. The last limited edition prints that Stan produced were a series of prints cosigned by twenty of the famed Tuskegee Airmen. In the winter of 1984, Stan entered the Smithsonian National Air and Space Museum’s “Golden Age of Flight” art competition. The painting he entered was of Jimmie Mattern’s Lockheed 12A Electra Jr. Stan personally knew Mr. Mattern and the Lockheed 12A was a great looking airplane. Stan took first place in the competition.

In October 1981, Stan met Bob and Jo Pond. Bob Pond had just started his collection of WWII aircraft that later became the nucleus of what is now the Palm Springs Air Museum. Stan was there alongside Bob as he proceeded to collect all of the amazing aircraft that Bob had a passion for. That allowed Stan to get up close and personal with all of the fabulous aircraft of that era including flights in most of these aircraft. Bob Pond had been thinking about turning his growing collection of World War II aircraft into a museum and in 1983 he started to turn this idea into reality. As his museum began to come together, Bob commissioned Stan to create paintings of the aircraft as they were acquired and brought into the museum. This included a mural of Bob's Corsair on approach to land on the USS Essex. These paintings, including the Corsair mural, are now also on display at the Palm Springs Air Museum.

NASA Years 
In the mid-1980's, Stan became a NASA artist. This involved being commissioned by NASA to create very specific paintings of research aircraft and space craft. These included paintings of the Space Shuttle Orbiters, SR-71, X Planes, Lifting Bodies and other NASA craft after being on site for launches, landings, etc. The most spectacular of these were the night launch of the Space Shuttle Atlantis and preparation and takeoff of an SR-71.

Blue Angels 

With more than two decades of painting as a full-time career, Stan had amassed a lengthy list of paintings honoring US Naval Aviation. In March 1992, he was offered a ride with the Blue Angels. Upon arrival at Naval Air Facility El Centro, he was put through the basics of flying in the Blue Angel's F/A-18B Hornet, aircraft #7. He would be flying with LT Dave Stewart. The flight was to be just the single aircraft, not with the entire team, but this was to be a good thing. They had the jet for an hour, long enough to go through all of the aerobatic maneuvers and still have time to let Stan try his hand at flying the F/A-18B. The flight ended with some simulated carrier landings on the El Centro runway.

To celebrate the 70th Anniversary of the Blue Angeles in 2016, Stan was commissioned to create a painting celebrating their first 100 years. The painting has one of every type of aircraft that has been flown by the Blue Angels Demonstration Team throughout the years. The painting is now in the collection of the Blue Angels Foundation in Pensacola, FL.

Tuskegee Airmen 
HBO had produced a movie honoring the Tuskegee Airmen in 1995. The person who had written the screenplay for the movie was Capt. Robert W. Williams. As a combat veteran flying in WWII with the 332nd Fighter Group, the Tuskegee Airmen, Mr. Williams had lived the story in the HBO movie. In the late 1990s, Stan was approached Mr. Williams who had developed an idea of having a large mural created to honor the Tuskegee Airmen that would be in a permanent location. Stan agreed to work toward putting together Mr. William's great idea. It took several years, start to finish, but by early 2002, it was completed and is now proudly displayed at the Palm Springs Air Museum. Along with the Tuskegee Airmen Mural, the Palm Springs Air Museum has an airworthy P-51 Mustang painted in the colors of Tuskegee Airman Bob Friend.

After the completion of the mural, Stan continued to honor the Tuskegee Airmen and other pilots of color by creating works of art depicting their stories. He has now completed over eighty paintings about the Tuskegee Airmen.

Presidential Libraries 
Not too long after the completion of the Tuskegee Airmen, a group from the Ronald Reagan Presidential Library stopped by the Palm Springs Air Museum to have a look at the Tuskegee Airmen Mural along with several other of Stan's murals. They were working up ideas for their new “Air Force One Pavilion” that was under construction in Simi Valley, CA. What ultimately transpired from that visit was Stan's “History of the Flying White House” mural that is on display, along with an actual retired Air Force One jet in the Air Force One Pavilion. Stan also painted a very large oil painting of the aircraft carrier USS Ronald Reagan that is also in the Library's collection.

This led directly to Stan being commissioned to create a couple of large paintings for the George H.W. Bush Presidential Library of the aircraft carrier USS George H.W. Bush. It further led to Stan creating an oil painting of the USS Gerald R. Ford for the Gerald R. Ford Presidential Library in Ann Arbor, MI.

Neil Armstrong Flight Research Center 
One of Stan's heroes as he grew up was astronaut Neil Armstrong. When that chance came up to do a large painting of Mr. Armstrong for the Neil Armstrong Flight Research Center at Edwards Air Force Base, Stan jumped at it. Working with Cam Martin, the retired Chief of the Office of External Affairs at NASA's Edwards location, the two poured through everything that they could find regarding Mr. Armstrong's flight history. This visual story goes from Neil's humble beginnings as a student pilot in an Aeronca Champion to an astronaut traveling to the moon in Apollo 11 and everything in between.

Centennial of Naval Aviation 
A group of former US Naval Aviators, headed by Jimmy “Guido” DiMatteo, commissioned Stan to paint a large painting honoring the “Centennial of Naval Aviation”. Naval aviation had its beginnings with the Curtiss Triad in 1911. In 2011, there had been a celebration of the 100 years since the Navy took to the skies. There was a need to commemorate the event with something more permanent. This would be Stan's painting. When finished, the painting had over fifty aircraft flying over 6 aircraft carriers. This painting now hangs in the National Museum of Naval Aviation in Pensacola, FL. It can also be seen in the movie Top Gun Maverick.

San Diego Air and Space Museum 
Since 2006, Stan has painted over 85 portraits for San Diego Air and Space Museum’s “Hall of Fame”. These portraits are of the luminaries of aviation and space, past and present. Some of these people are famous names such as Bob Hoover, Clay Lacy, Sean Tucker, Patty Wagstaff, Bessie Coleman, and Barron Hilton. Others are name not as well know, but just as important such as John Herrington, Peggy Whitson, Joe Clark, Harry Robertson, and John J. Montgomery.

Palm Springs Air Museum 
Having been a fixture at the Palm Springs Air Museum since its inception in 1996, his works are to be found everywhere within the museum. This includes numerous paintings, nose art on the aircraft, dozens of portraits on the Museum's “Wall of Fame” and now a pair of murals in their new F-117 hangar. One is a cutaway view of the F-117 showing what is inside the aircraft, and the other is a mural honoring the “History of the Lockheed Skunk Works."

It tells the amazing story of the aircraft that came from the incredible minds that have made up the Skunk Works over the years.

Works
and many more!

Presidential library works
Stokes's 12-foot-by-120-foot mural of the "History of the Flying White House" is on permanent display in the new Air Force One Pavilion of the Ronald Reagan Presidential Library.

The George Bush Presidential Library in College Station, Texas, has two paintings by Stokes on permanent display.

Places Stan Stokes artwork can be found 

 Palm Springs Air Museum
 NASA
 Neil Armstrong Flight Research Center, Edwards AFB
 Smithsonian National Air and Space Museum.
 National Museum of Naval Aviation, Pensacola, FL
 USAF Art Collection
 George H.W. Bush Presidential Library
 Gerald R. Ford Presidential Library
 Ronald Reagan Presidential Library
 San Diego Air and Space Museum
 GE Aviation
 Monterey Maritime Museum
 89th Presidential Airlift Wing (Air Force One)
 Robertson Helicopters
 Museum of Natural History, New York, NY
 Blue Angels Foundation
 Planes of Fame, Chino, CA
 And numerous private collectors

Awards
 1975: 1st place, Benedictine Art Awards
 1985: 1st place, National Air and Space Museum's "Golden Age of Flight" art competition
 2000: R.G. Smith Award, National Museum of Naval Aviation

External links
 http://www.stanstokes.net/

1950 births
Living people
20th-century American painters
American male painters
21st-century American painters
Military art
20th-century American male artists
Aviation artists